PC1 may refer to:
 Furin, an enzyme
 Proprotein convertase 1, an enzyme
 Polycystin 1, a protein in humans associated with autosomal dominant polycystic kidney disease
 PC-1, a submarine telecommunications cable system (Pacific Crossing 1)
 PC1 cipher, used by the Amazon Kindle and some boot loaders
 First principal component in principal component analysis, often used in genetic distance visualizations